The Nottingham–Grantham line is a branch line between the city of Nottingham and the town of Grantham in the East Midlands of England. For most of its length it runs parallel to the A52.

The following places are served by the line:
Nottingham
Netherfield and Colwick
Radcliffe-on-Trent
Bingham
Aslockton and Whatton
Elton and Orston
Bottesford
Grantham

Routes to Skegness
At Grantham, the line meets the East Coast Main Line and also the Grantham–Skegness line. Not all Skegness-bound trains stop at Grantham, and the express service (limited stop) has its first stop at Sleaford, splitting from the Grantham line near Allington onto the Grantham Avoiding Line at Allington junction. The journey on this route to Skegness saves 30 minutes of the 2 hours 20 minutes journey via Grantham.

History
The line was initially operated by the Ambergate, Nottingham, Boston and Eastern Junction Railway from 15 July 1850, taken over by the GNR in 1852. At Bottesford, the line was crossed by a north-south LNWR line from Melton Mowbray to Newark-on-Trent (this northern section was owned by GNR). A western spur of this railway (through Barnstone) joined at Saxondale junction.

Services were disrupted in July 2012 when an embankment collapsed near Allington. The line also closed for some six weeks in the summer of 2013, as part of a large-scale improvement to Nottinghamshire's rail network. Skegness councillors were critical of the decision to close the line during the height of the tourist season, but Network Rail, the rail infrastructure company, stated that the summer was the quietest time on the line.

Cotgrave Colliery branch
It was built in 1960. The colliery closed in 1993 and the track was lifted in 2012.

Services
All services on the line are provided by East Midlands Railway. The Liverpool-Norwich service is usually formed of  Express Sprinter diesel multiple units (DMUs), the Skegness service of  Super Sprinter DMUs, occasionally supplemented by  Super Sprinter DMUs.

On very busy summer services to Skegness, East Midlands Railway will use a Class 43 with a set of Mark 3 coaches. These are otherwise be used on services to London from Sheffield, Derby and Nottingham that run express.

References

External links
"Binghams Railways". Bingham Heritage Trails Association. Retrieved 21 July 2012

Rail transport in Lincolnshire
Rail transport in Nottinghamshire
Railway lines opened in 1850
Railway lines in the East Midlands
Standard gauge railways in England